Intellectual Scum is a 2015 Kenyan short film directed by Njue Kevin. Produced by Rocque Pictures, the film is an adaptation of the controversial article 'You Lazy (Intellectual) African Scum!'  by Field Ruwe, a USA based Zambian media practitioner.

Plot 
On board a commercial airplane, an African intellectual (Field Ruwe), sits next to a white man (Walter). In their conversation, which is utterly brutal, honest and to some racist, Walter blames the ‘Intellectuals’ for the deplorable state Africa was in.

Cast
Jason Corder as Walter
Patrick Oketch as Field Ruwe 
Kevin Samuel as the analyst
Mkamzee Mwatela as the moderator
Edward Kagure as the thief
Niki Behr as the flight attendant

Production 
Principal photography on the film began on 15 November 2015 and ended on 20 November 2015. The plane sequence on the film was shot on an actual plane at Wilson airport as opposed to creating a set on a sound stage.

The director, Njue Kevin, on this decision said, "We would have used twice the budget on a set other than the actual airport. When on a shoestring budget, you have to do what you have to do."

Accolades
Intellectual Scum has been met with widespread critical acclaim. Screening in three continents across the globe, critics across the east African region plod it as being the most successful short film in the history of film in Kenya.

It has screened at the following festivals thus far:
 Silicon Valley African Film Festival 2015, CA, USA.
 Film Africa 2015, United Kingdom.
 Africa international film festival, 2015. Nigeria - Student shorts - screened.
 Africa Film Festival "Out of Europe" in Cologne/Germany.
 Cork Africa Film festival 2015, Ireland.
 Afrika Film festival 2016, Belgium.
 Luxor African film festival 2016, Egypt.
 Cameroon International Film Festival, 2016.
 Out of Africa Film festival 2015, Kenya.
 The Zanzibar International Film Festival 2015.
 Slum Film festival, 2015. Kenya - Judges Choice Awards -*Winner-
 Golden Diana awards, 2015. Austria
 Kalasha Film and Television awards 2015, Kenya.-Best Feature by a student- Nominated

References 

 Daily Nation
  Business Daily Africa
 mobile.nation.ke
 Film Kenya magazine
  Pontetash Review
  Up Nairobi Magazine
  Varcity Kenya
 Actors Kenya

External links 
 http://www.rocquepictures.com/index.html Official Website
 

2015 films
Kenyan short films